Waal is a hamlet in the Dutch province of South Holland. It is a part of the municipality of Molenlanden, and lies about 13 km north of Gorinchem on the southside of the Lek River.

The statistical area "Waal", which also can include the surrounding countryside, has a population of around 110.

References

Populated places in South Holland
Molenlanden